Lord Henry John Spencer (20 December 1770 – 3 July 1795) was a British diplomat and politician.

Spencer was the second son of George Spencer, 4th Duke of Marlborough and his wife, Caroline and was educated at Eton College and Christ Church, Oxford. In 1790, he was elected Member of Parliament for Woodstock and was briefly secretary to Lord Auckland, British Ambassador at The Hague that year. From 1790 to 1793, he was himself ambassador until transferring to Sweden in 1793. In 1795, he was transferred to Prussia but died of fever at Berlin on 3 July, aged twenty-four.

References
Attribution

Alumni of Christ Church, Oxford
Members of the Parliament of Great Britain for English constituencies
Younger sons of dukes
1770 births
1795 deaths
British MPs 1790–1796
Ambassadors of Great Britain to Sweden
Ambassadors of Great Britain to the Netherlands
People educated at Eton College